is a former Nippon Professional Baseball pitcher.

References 

1968 births
Living people
Baseball people from Tokushima Prefecture
Baseball players at the 1988 Summer Olympics
Olympic baseball players of Japan
Olympic silver medalists for Japan
Nippon Professional Baseball pitchers
Seibu Lions players
Japanese baseball coaches
Nippon Professional Baseball coaches
Medalists at the 1988 Summer Olympics